St John Singapore is a voluntary secular organisation in Singapore established in 1877 which provides training in First Aid and Home Nursing. It is affiliated with the Order of Saint John based in the United Kingdom. Its ambulance members (male members) and nursing members (female members) perform voluntary first aid coverage duties during national events and other events. It comprises 3 sub-organisations, namely the St John Brigade Singapore, St John Association Singapore, St John Fellowship Singapore.

The National Headquarters (NHQ) is located at 420 Beach Road and was officially opened on 23 July 1960 by the Yang di-Pertuan Negara (and subsequently President of Singapore), Encik Yusof bin Ishak.

History 
In 1877, the St John Ambulance Association (SJAA) was established in Singapore to train people in first aid. The St John Ambulance Brigade (SJAB), the uniformed companion body of the SJAA, was established in 1887 to gather qualified volunteers to render medical aid during public events and emergencies.

In 1885, the SJAA center was established in Singapore. After a few years, the centre closed and reopened in 1906. The centre closed again after its honorary secretary died.

In 1930, Chen Su Lan restarted a new SJAA centre and its first batch of trainees graduated in 1933. The uniformed division was subsequently established in September 1938

In 1952, the St John Council was created to manage both SJAB and SJAA in Singapore and in 1970, the council was registered as the National St John Council of Singapore.

In 1980, the SJAA and SJAB came together to be known as St John Ambulance Singapore (SJAS).

In January 2014, the Order of St John conferred SJAS the status of Priory.  SJAS was then renamed as St John Singapore in the same year.

Organisation and Structure 
St John Singapore consists of 2 branches, the St John Association and the St John Brigade. 

The St John Association is the training wing and was established in 1885. It provides training in First Aid, Home Nursing, Child Care, and other related subjects to the public.

The St John Brigade is the uniformed branch which provides First Aid and ambulance services, and provide youth development through a Cadet programme.

It also has an alumni association, the St John Fellowship.

Appointment holders 
Patron-in-Chief: H.E. The President of Singapore

Chairman : Dr S R E Sayampanathan PBM, KStJ
Vice Chairmen : 
Dr Nelson Chua Ping Ping PP, PBS, CStJ
Dr Dave Lee Yee Han OStJ
Mr Tian Mong Ching CStJ

Hon Secretary : Mr Lim Keng Hean 
Hon Treasurer : Ms Wendy Neo SSStJ
Assistant Hon Treasurer : Dr Ramesh Subramaniam MStJ

Core Competencies 
Typically, cadet members undergo training in four core competencies – First Aid, Home Nursing (for Nursing members), Transportation of Casualty (for Ambulance members), Foot Drill and Physical Training. These are conducted through Routine Training and other Training Camps that vary from Corps to Corps and District to District. In the interest of holistic development, cadet members also have the opportunity to participate in enrichment activities which can allow them to earn Cadet Proficiency Badges. Outstanding cadet members are awarded the prestigious Chief Commissioner's Badge after attaining 12 proficiency badges (with 2 from each of the 4 badge groups, Knowledge of the Order of St John (KOTO) Badge, and the Total Defence Badge).

St John Day 
As St John the Baptist Day, 24 June, normally falls during the Singapore School Holidays, corps typically observe St. John Day on the first Wednesday after school reopens. On that day, members don their Brigade Uniform during official school hours. A St John Day message by the Chief Commissioner is read out by the Principal or student leader during the morning flag raising ceremony. Where possible, the St John Flag is also raised alongside the State Flag and the respective School Flag. On this day also, members reaffirm their loyalty to the Republic of Singapore and affirm their commitment to the twin mottoes of the Order, 'For the Faith' and 'For the Service of Humanity', in reciting the St John Pledge.

Badges

Brigade Badges 

The following badges are listed in order of precedence:
 Chief Commissioner's Badge 
 Deputy Chief Commissioner's Badge
 Commissioner's Badge
 Superintendent's Badge
 Drill Instructor Badge
 Unicorn Badge (Cease to be issued from 2018)
 National First Aid Competition Champion Badge
 National Activity Badge

Corps Appointment Badges 
 Corps Secretary
 Corps Storekeeper

National First Aid and Home Nursing Competition 

The National First Aid and Home Nursing Competition, typically referred to as the National First Aid Competition (NFAC), is an annual inter-district competition in which all 5 districts send teams to compete in each of the 4 categories. Prior to the NFAC, each district organises its own Inter-Corps First Aid and Home Nursing Competition with a similar competition framework. The 4 champion teams from each district represent their respective districts in the NFAC.

Competition Categories 
The 4 categories are listed below:

Competition Framework 
There are 2 frameworks for the competition, one for the Ambulance categories and one for the Nursing categories.

Ambulance Category Framework 
AA and AC teams are expected to complete the following as part of the competition:
 First Aid Long Case (20 mins)
 First Aid Short Case (10 mins)
 Transportation of Casualty
 Foot Drill (10 mins)

Nursing Category Framework 
NA and NC teams are expected to complete the following as part of the competition:
 Home Nursing Case (20 mins)
 First Aid Medium Case (10 mins)
 Foot Drill (7 mins)

Dress Regulations

Uniforms 
At present, there are a total of 4 uniforms of St. John Brigade Singapore, which are listed as follows:
 Ceremonial Uniform
 Mess Kit
 Safari Uniform
 Field Uniform
Cadet members are presently only entitled to wear the Field Uniform, which is also the most widely recognised uniform of the St. John Brigade Singapore. The Field Uniform consists of a black beret with a cap badge, depending on which is entitled to the wearer. Nursing members wear a hairnet as well. The top consists of a white short-sleeved shirt / blouse with plastic concealed buttons. For female members, due to the white uniform, bras should be of decent colours if worn. Shoulder flashes bearing the Maltese Cross with twin beasts and unicorns, together with the words "St. John Singapore" are worn on both sleeves. A black epaulette is worn on both shoulders denoting the rank of the member. The bottom consists of black pants / culottes, which is worn with the St. John belt. Black socks and black low-cut boots are worn with the shoelaces tied in the formal-style.

For Presidents, Senior Officers, Officers and Warrant Officers, the following 4 uniforms are worn:

Head Dress

Beret

Peak Cap and Bowler Hat

Distinguishing Marks

Collar Badges

Gorget Patches

Rank structure 
As a uniformed organisation that has a military heritage that originated with the Order of St. John, a rank structure used to distinguish members and appointment holders. In general, the rank one holds within the organisation corresponds with their appointment.

Presidents

Orders, Decorations and Medals 

Officers and members are entitled to receive the following Orders, Decorations and Medals:

Local Awards 
 The Commendation Medal of St John (CMSJ)
 The Priory Medal
 The 5 Years First Aid Efficiency Medal
 The Golden Jubilee Medal

International Awards (awarded by the Order of St John) 
 The Bailiff / Dame Grand Cross of the Order of St John (GCStJ)
 The Knights / Dame of Justice of the Order of St John (KStJ / DStJ)
 The Knights / Dame of Grace of the Order of St John (KStJ / DStJ)
 The Commander of the Order of St John (CStJ)
 The Officer of the Order of St John (OStJ)
 The Member of the Order of St John (MStJ)
 The Life-Saving Medal of the Order of St John
 The Service Medal of the Order of St John

See also 
 Order of St John
 St John Ambulance
 St John Ambulance Ranks and Insignia
 St. Andrew's Ambulance Association
 Service Medal of the Order of St John
 Insignia of the Venerable Order of St John

References

External links 

 

Youth organisations based in Singapore
Singapore
1938 establishments in Singapore